Jamna  is a village in the administrative district of Gmina Zakliczyn, within Tarnów County, Lesser Poland Voivodeship, in southern Poland.

References

External links
  The article about Jamna with photos
  The local Jamna's page

Jamna